The 2007 season of Úrvalsdeild karla was the 96th season of top tier football in Iceland. Title contenders were considered to be KR, FH, ÍA and Valur. HK were playing for the first time in Landsbankadeild. The league was expanded from 10 teams to 12 teams after the 2007 season, therefore only one team was relegated and 3 were promoted from the 1. deild karla. The first match day of the season was on 12 May. Valur won the league for the first time in 20 years and Vikingur were relegated to 1. deild karla.

Fram's Jónas Grani Garðarsson was the top scorer with 13 goals.

Final league table

Results
Each team played every opponent once home and away for a total of 18 matches.

References

Úrvalsdeild karla (football) seasons
1
Iceland
Iceland